John FitzGerald, 18th Earl of Kildare (1661 – 9 November 1707), styled Lord Offaly until 1664, was an Irish peer.

Background
Kildare was the son of Wentworth FitzGerald, 17th Earl of Kildare, and Lady Elizabeth, daughter of John Holles, 2nd Earl of Clare. He succeeded his father in the earldom in 1664.

Political career
Kildare was returned to the English House of Commons for Tregony in 1694, a seat he only held until the following year.

Family

Kildare married firstly, Mary, daughter of Henry O'Brien, Lord O'Brien. They had one child, Henry FitzGerald, Lord Offaly (1683–1684), who died as an infant. After Mary's death in November 1683, aged 21, Kildare married secondly, Lady Elizabeth, daughter of Richard Jones, 1st Earl of Ranelagh, on 12 June 1684. There were no children from this marriage. 

Kildare died in November 1707 and was succeeded in the earldom by his first cousin, Robert FitzGerald, 19th Earl of Kildare. The Countess of Kildare died in April 1758.

References

  

 
   
   

John
1661 births
1707 deaths
17th-century Irish people
18th-century Irish people
People from County Kildare
Members of the pre-1707 English Parliament for constituencies in Cornwall
English MPs 1690–1695
Earls of Kildare
Barons Offaly